In algebra, a split complex number (or hyperbolic number, also perplex number, double number) is based on a hyperbolic unit  satisfying  A split-complex number has two real number components  and , and is written  The conjugate of  is  Since  the product of a number  with its conjugate is  an isotropic quadratic form.

The collection  of all split complex numbers  for  forms an algebra over the field of real numbers.

The ring isomorphism

See the article Motor variable for functions of a split-complex number.

Definition
A split-complex number is an ordered pair of real numbers, written in the form

In the field of complex numbers  the imaginary unit i satisfies  The change of sign distinguishes the split-complex numbers from the ordinary complex ones. The hyperbolic unit  is not a real number but an independent quantity.

The collection of all such  is called the split-complex plane. Addition and multiplication of split-complex numbers are defined by

This multiplication is commutative, associative and distributes over addition.

Conjugate, modulus, and bilinear form
Just as for complex numbers, one can define the notion of a split-complex conjugate. If

The conjugate satisfies similar properties to usual complex conjugate. Namely,

These three properties imply that the split-complex conjugate is an automorphism of order 2.

The squared modulus of a split-complex number  is given by the isotropic quadratic form

It has the composition algebra property:

However, this quadratic form is not positive-definite but rather has signature , so the modulus is not a norm.

The associated bilinear form is given by

where  and  Another expression for the squared modulus is then

Since it is not positive-definite, this bilinear form is not an inner product; nevertheless the bilinear form is frequently referred to as an indefinite inner product. A similar abuse of language refers to the modulus as a norm.

A split-complex number is invertible if and only if its modulus is nonzero  thus numbers of the form  have no inverse. The multiplicative inverse of an invertible element is given by

Split-complex numbers which are not invertible are called null vectors. These are all of the form  for some real number .

The diagonal basis

It is often convenient to use  and ∗ as an alternate basis for the split-complex plane. This basis is called the diagonal basis or null basis. The split-complex number  can be written in the null basis as

The split-complex conjugate in the diagonal basis is given by

and the modulus by

Isomorphism

On the basis {e, e*} it becomes clear that the split-complex numbers are ring-isomorphic to the direct sum  with addition and multiplication defined pairwise.

Now the quadratic form is  Furthermore,

The action of hyperbolic versor  then corresponds under this linear transformation to a squeeze mapping

Though lying in the same isomorphism class in the category of rings, the split-complex plane and the direct sum of two real lines differ in their layout in the Cartesian plane. The dilation in particular has sometimes caused confusion in connection with areas of a hyperbolic sector. Indeed, hyperbolic angle corresponds to area of a sector in the  plane with its "unit circle" given by  The contracted unit hyperbola  of the split-complex plane has only half the area in the span of a corresponding hyperbolic sector.

Geometry

A two-dimensional real vector space with the Minkowski inner product is called -dimensional Minkowski space, often denoted  Just as much of the geometry of the Euclidean plane  can be described with complex numbers, the geometry of the Minkowski plane  can be described with split-complex numbers.

The set of points

The case  is called the unit hyperbola. The conjugate hyperbola is given by

The hyperbola and conjugate hyperbola are separated by two diagonal asymptotes which form the set of null elements:

While analogous to ordinary orthogonality, particularly as it is known with ordinary complex number arithmetic, this condition is more subtle. It forms the basis for the simultaneous hyperplane concept in spacetime.

The analogue of Euler's formula for the split-complex numbers is

This formula can be derived from a power series expansion using the fact that cosh has only even powers while that for sinh has odd powers. For all real values of the hyperbolic angle  the split-complex number  has norm 1 and lies on the right branch of the unit hyperbola. Numbers such as  have been called hyperbolic versors.

Multiplying by  preserves the geometric structure, taking hyperbolas to themselves and the null cone to itself.

The set of all transformations of the split-complex plane which preserve the modulus (or equivalently, the inner product) forms a group called the generalized orthogonal group . This group consists of the hyperbolic rotations, which form a subgroup denoted , combined with four discrete reflections given by
 and 

The exponential map

If a split-complex number  does not lie on one of the diagonals, then  has a polar decomposition.

Algebraic properties
In abstract algebra terms, the split-complex numbers can be described as the quotient of the polynomial ring  by the ideal generated by the polynomial 

With this description, it is clear that the split-complex numbers form a commutative algebra over the real numbers. The algebra is not a field since the null elements are not invertible. All of the nonzero null elements are zero divisors.

Since addition and multiplication are continuous operations with respect to the usual topology of the plane, the split-complex numbers form a topological ring.

The algebra of split-complex numbers forms a composition algebra since

From the definition it is apparent that the ring of split-complex numbers is isomorphic to the group ring  of the cyclic group  over the real numbers

Matrix representations
One can easily represent split-complex numbers by matrices. The split-complex number
 can be represented by the matrix 

Addition and multiplication of split-complex numbers are then given by matrix addition and multiplication.

In fact there are many representations of the split-complex plane in the four-dimensional ring of 2x2 real matrices. The real multiples of the identity matrix form a real line in the matrix ring M(2,R). Any hyperbolic unit m provides a basis element with which to extend the real line to the split-complex plane. The matrices
 which square to the identity matrix satisfy 
For example, when a = 0, then (b,c) is a point on the standard hyperbola. More generally, there is a hypersurface in M(2,R) of hyperbolic units, any one of which serves in a basis to represent the split-complex numbers as a subring of M(2,R).

The number  can be represented by the matrix

History
The use of split-complex numbers dates back to 1848 when James Cockle revealed his tessarines. William Kingdon Clifford used split-complex numbers to represent sums of spins. Clifford introduced the use of split-complex numbers as coefficients in a quaternion algebra now called split-biquaternions. He called its elements "motors", a term in parallel with the "rotor" action of an ordinary complex number taken from the circle group. Extending the analogy, functions of a motor variable contrast to functions of an ordinary complex variable.

Since the late twentieth century, the split-complex multiplication has commonly been seen as a Lorentz boost of a spacetime plane. The future corresponds to the quadrant of events , which has the split-complex polar decomposition . The model says that  can be reached from the origin by entering a frame of reference of rapidity  and waiting  nanoseconds. The split-complex equation

expressing products on the unit hyperbola illustrates the additivity of rapidities for collinear velocities. Simultaneity of events depends on rapidity ;

is the line of events simultaneous with the origin in the frame of reference with rapidity a.

In 1933 Max Zorn was using the split-octonions and noted the composition algebra property. He realized that the Cayley–Dickson construction, used to generate division algebras, could be modified (with a factor gamma) to construct other composition algebras including the split-octonions. His innovation was perpetuated by Adrian Albert, Richard D. Schafer, and others. Reviewing Albert for Mathematical Reviews, N. H. McCoy wrote that there was an "introduction of some new algebras of order 2e over F generalizing Cayley–Dickson algebras." Taking  and  corresponds to the algebra of this article.

In 1935 J.C. Vignaux and A. Durañona y Vedia developed the split-complex geometric algebra and function theory in four articles in Contribución a las Ciencias Físicas y Matemáticas, National University of La Plata, República Argentina (in Spanish). These expository and pedagogical essays presented the subject for broad appreciation.

In 1941 E.F. Allen used the split-complex geometric arithmetic to establish the nine-point hyperbola of a triangle inscribed in .

In 1956 Mieczyslaw Warmus published "Calculus of Approximations" in Bulletin de l’Académie polonaise des sciences (see link in References). He developed two algebraic systems, each of which he called "approximate numbers", the second of which forms a real algebra. D. H. Lehmer reviewed the article in Mathematical Reviews and observed that this second system was isomorphic to the "hyperbolic complex" numbers, the subject of this article.

In 1961 Warmus continued his exposition, referring to the components of an approximate number as midpoint and radius of the interval denoted.

Synonyms
Different authors have used a great variety of names for the split-complex numbers. Some of these include:

 (real) tessarines,  James Cockle (1848)
 (algebraic) motors, W.K. Clifford (1882)
 hyperbolic complex numbers, J.C. Vignaux (1935)
 bireal numbers, U. Bencivenga (1946)
 approximate numbers, Warmus (1956), for use in interval analysis
 double numbers, I.M. Yaglom (1968), Kantor and Solodovnikov (1989), Hazewinkel (1990), Rooney (2014)
 anormal-complex numbers, W. Benz (1973)
 perplex numbers, P. Fjelstad (1986) and Poodiack & LeClair (2009)
 countercomplex or hyperbolic, Carmody (1988)
 Lorentz numbers, F.R. Harvey (1990)
 hyperbolic numbers, G. Sobczyk (1995)
 paracomplex numbers, Cruceanu, Fortuny & Gadea (1996)
 semi-complex numbers, F. Antonuccio (1994)
 split binarions, K. McCrimmon (2004)
 split-complex numbers, B. Rosenfeld (1997)
 spacetime numbers, N. Borota (2000)
 Study numbers, P. Lounesto (2001)
 twocomplex numbers, S. Olariu (2002)

See also

 Minkowski space
 Split-quaternion
 Hypercomplex number

References

Further reading
 Bencivenga, Uldrico (1946) "Sulla rappresentazione geometrica delle algebre doppie dotate di modulo", Atti della Reale Accademia delle Scienze e Belle-Lettere di Napoli, Ser (3) v.2 No7. .
 Walter Benz (1973) Vorlesungen uber Geometrie der Algebren, Springer
 N. A. Borota, E. Flores, and T. J. Osler (2000) "Spacetime numbers the easy way", Mathematics and Computer Education 34: 159–168.
 N. A. Borota and T. J. Osler (2002) "Functions of a spacetime variable", Mathematics and Computer Education 36: 231–239.
 K. Carmody, (1988) "Circular and hyperbolic quaternions, octonions, and sedenions", Appl. Math. Comput. 28:47–72.
 K. Carmody, (1997) "Circular and hyperbolic quaternions, octonions, and sedenions – further results", Appl. Math. Comput. 84:27–48.
 William Kingdon Clifford (1882) Mathematical Works, A. W. Tucker editor, page 392, "Further Notes on Biquaternions"
 V.Cruceanu, P. Fortuny & P.M. Gadea (1996) A Survey on Paracomplex Geometry, Rocky Mountain Journal of Mathematics 26(1): 83–115, link from Project Euclid.
 De Boer, R. (1987) "An also known as list for perplex numbers", American Journal of Physics 55(4):296.
 Anthony A. Harkin & Joseph B. Harkin (2004) Geometry of Generalized Complex Numbers, Mathematics Magazine 77(2):118–29.
 F. Reese Harvey. Spinors and calibrations. Academic Press, San Diego. 1990. . Contains a description of normed algebras in indefinite signature, including the Lorentz numbers.
 Hazewinkle, M. (1994) "Double and dual numbers", Encyclopaedia of Mathematics, Soviet/AMS/Kluwer, Dordrect.
 Kevin McCrimmon (2004) A Taste of Jordan Algebras, pp 66, 157, Universitext, Springer  
 C. Musès, "Applied hypernumbers: Computational concepts", Appl. Math. Comput. 3 (1977) 211–226.
 C. Musès, "Hypernumbers II—Further concepts and computational applications", Appl. Math. Comput. 4 (1978) 45–66.
 Olariu, Silviu (2002) Complex Numbers in N Dimensions, Chapter 1: Hyperbolic Complex Numbers in Two Dimensions, pages 1–16, North-Holland Mathematics Studies #190, Elsevier .
 Poodiack, Robert D. & Kevin J. LeClair (2009) "Fundamental theorems of algebra for the perplexes", The College Mathematics Journal 40(5):322–35.
 Isaak Yaglom (1968) Complex Numbers in Geometry, translated by E. Primrose from 1963 Russian original, Academic Press, pp. 18–20.
 

Composition algebras
Linear algebra
Hypercomplex numbers